Ken Hayes (born 1931) was the head men's basketball coach at Tulsa (1968–75), New Mexico State (1975–79), Oral Roberts (1979–82) and Northeastern State (1983–97). Hayes was inducted into the Tulsa University Athletics Hall of Fame (2008), the Northeastern State Athletics Hall of Fame (1999), and the Bacone College Athletics Hall of Fame (2013).

Head coaching record

References

External links
 Coaching Record

1931 births
Living people
American men's basketball coaches
Bacone Warriors men's basketball coaches
Basketball coaches from Oklahoma
College men's basketball head coaches in the United States
High school basketball coaches in the United States
Junior college men's basketball coaches in the United States
New Mexico State Aggies men's basketball coaches
Northeastern State University alumni
Northeastern State RiverHawks men's basketball coaches
Oral Roberts Golden Eagles men's basketball coaches
Tulsa Golden Hurricane men's basketball coaches